Bjørn Puggaard-Müller (13 March 1922 – 13 May 1989) was a Danish film actor. He appeared in more than 90 films between 1945 and 1988. He was born in Gentofte, Denmark and died in Denmark.

Filmography

Panik i familien - 1945
Sikken en nat - 1947
Dorte - 1951
To minutter for sent - 1952
Kongeligt besøg - 1954
I kongens klær - 1954
Kristiane af Marstal - 1956
Natlogi betalt - 1957
Sønnen fra Amerika - 1957
Tre piger fra Jylland - 1957
Det lille hotel - 1958
Pigen og vandpytten - 1958
Pigen i søgelyset - 1959
Soldaterkammerater rykker ud - 1959
Vi er allesammen tossede - 1959
Skibet er ladet med - 1960
Baronessen fra benzintanken - 1960
Eventyr på Mallorca - 1961
Gøngehøvdingen - 1961
Støv på hjernen - 1961
Den grønne elevator - 1961
Prinsesse for en dag - 1962
Soldaterkammerater på sjov - 1962
Han, hun, Dirch og Dario - 1962
Frøken April - 1963
Vi har det jo dejligt - 1963
Når enden er go' - 1964
Alt for kvinden - 1964
Slottet - 1964
Næsbygaards arving - 1965
Een pige og 39 sømænd - 1965
En ven i bolignøden - 1965
Min søsters børn - 1966
Dyden går amok - 1966
Flagermusen - 1966
Gys og gæve tanter - 1966
Utro - 1966
Soyas tagsten - 1967
Jeg - en marki - 1967
Det er ikke appelsiner - det er heste - 1967
Smukke Arne og Rosa - 1967
Min kones ferie - 1967
Min søsters børn på bryllupsrejse - 1967
Martha - 1967
Far laver sovsen - 1967
I den grønne skov - 1968
Jeg elsker blåt - 1968
Jeg - en kvinde 2 - 1968
Min søsters børn vælter byen - 1968
Olsen-banden - 1968
Stormvarsel - 1968
Det var en lørdag aften - 1968
Mig og min lillebror og storsmuglerne - 1968
Der kom en soldat - 1969
Himmel og helvete - 1969
Olsen-banden på spanden - 1969
Sonja - 16 år - 1969
Ta' lidt solskin - 1969
Nøglen til Paradis - 1970
Hurra for de blå husarer - 1970
Rend mig i revolutionen - 1970
Christa - 1970
Ballade på Christianshavn - 1971
Tandlæge på sengekanten - 1971
Den forsvundne fuldmægtig - 1971
Rektor på sengekanten - 1972
Motorvej på sengekanten - 1972
På'en igen Amalie - 1973
Romantik på sengekanten - 1973
I Jomfruens tegn - 1973
Familien Gyldenkål - 1975
Julefrokosten - 1976
Sømænd på sengekanten - 1976
Hopla på sengekanten - 1976
Affæren i Mølleby - 1976
Spøgelsestoget - 1976
Pas på ryggen, professor - 1977
Skytten - 1977
Fængslende feriedage - 1978
Firmaskovturen - 1978
Olsen-banden går i krig - 1978
Det parallelle lig - 1982
Kurt og Valde - 1983
Mord i Paradis - 1988

References

External links

1922 births
1989 deaths
Danish male film actors
People from Gentofte Municipality
20th-century Danish male actors
Puggaard family